The Whippet is a dog breed of medium size. It is a sighthound breed that originated in England, descended from the Greyhound. Whippets today still strongly resemble a smaller Greyhound. Part of the hound group, Whippets have relatively few health problems other than arrhythmia. Whippets also participate in dog sports such as lure coursing, agility, dock diving and flyball. The name is derived from an early 17th-century word, now obsolete, meaning "to move briskly".

There has been continuity in describing Greyhound-types of different sizes: large, medium and small, recorded in hunting manuals and works on natural history from the Middle Ages. Edward of Norwich, 2nd Duke of York confirmed in his early 15th-century translation and additions to the original late 14th-century French Livre de chasse the advantage of maintaining the great, the middle, and the small size of greyhound for different sorts of game. The English physician and academic John Caius refers in his 16th century De Canibus Britannicus to lesser as well as greater sorts of Leporarius, Grehounde (greyhound) and notably to a type which has been connected to the Whippet, the Tumbler, a lesser sort of mungrell Greyhounde and excellent warren dog for catching rabbits, also recorded by the early 19th-century Scottish curator and editor Thomas Brown. The Victorian English writers describe the emerging modern breed of Whippet or snap-dog bred for catching rabbits, coursing competitions, straight rag-racing, and for the novel show fancy. 

This has led to Whippets being described as "the poor man's greyhound". They are a popular companion breed frequently used in amateur racing, lure coursing, and dog shows; they have the highest running speed of breeds for their weight: and are possibly the fastest-accelerating dog breed.
 

History 

Whippets were bred to hunt by sight, coursing game in open areas at high speeds. There are numerous representations of small greyhound-like hounds in art dating back to Ancient Egyptian times. In medieval England, a small Greyhound breed became popular for use as a ratting dog; the first written English use of the word Whippet with regard to a type of dog was in 1610. 
Whippets were commonly known as "snap dogs" for their tendency to "snap up" nearby prey. In the picture by Jean-Baptiste Oudry (1686–1755) of two dogs presented to Louis XV, they are either Whippets or small Greyhounds, but are probably related to an early form of Whippet. Oudry also painted a second painting of Misse with a different, non-sighthound dog. There is a 1758 painting by Pompeo Batoni entitled Portrait of Charles Compton, 7th Earl of Northampton which features a similar whippet-like dog.

In the 19th century, Whippet racing was a popular sport in parts of England. The Whippet was held in high regard in the northern parts of England and Wales, but was generally disregarded in the rest of the country. At the time, there were two varieties of Whippet. The first type had a smooth coat, was more popular in Lancashire, Yorkshire, and the Midlands, and became the modern Whippet. The other had a rough coat from crossbreeding with Bedlington Terriers. This type was more popular in Durham and Northumberland and was frequently referred to as a "rabbit dog". Early specimens were taken from the race track by the dog fanciers of the time and exported around the world. John Taylor said that "In all the shapes and forms of dogges; of all which there are but two sorts that are useful to man's profits, which two are the mastiffe and the little curre, whippet, or house-dogge; all the rest are for pleasure and recreation."

The age of the modern Whippet dawned in 1891 when The Kennel Club granted the breed official recognition, thus making the Whippet eligible for competition in dog shows, and commencing the recording of their pedigrees. In the United States, the Whippet was recognised in 1888 by the American Kennel Club. Whippets arrived in the United States with mill operators from England, and the first populations were established in Massachusetts. The Whippet is the 55th most popular breed according to the American Kennel Club.

In 1964, Ch. Courtenay Fleetfoot of Pennyworth won best in show at the Westminster Kennel Club Dog Show. In 1992, Pencloe Dutch Gold won best in show at Crufts, a Whippet known as Cobyco Call the Tune won in 2004, and in 2018 the award was achieved by Ch Collooney Tartan Tease. In 2011, GCh. Starline's Chanel, a female Whippet, was chosen as the hound Show Dog of the Year by the Westminster Kennel Club.

Racing

Dog racing was originally an extension of hare coursing. Whippets began to be bred to race in the mid-nineteenth century. The first form of the sport was a rudimentary form of coursing known as 'ragging', and dogs who participated were said to be 'trained to the rag'. Dogs were kept on a leash by a person known as a slip, who was frequently also the race judge. The slip would release the dogs from their collars at the same time, and they would race towards their owners, who were standing at the opposite end of the track waving towels.

Whippet rags were a popular Sunday event in the north and Midlands at the time. There were also international events; in Australia, at a track known as Gurney's Paddock, there were races of more than 300 whippets every Saturday, and three nights a week at the White City track. Eventually, the sport evolved and dogs were divided into four groups: those who hunted rabbits, which was not governed by rules; those who coursed hare, for which a set of rules was established; those trained to the rag; and those trained to chase a mechanical lure in a fashion similar to Greyhound races. Few of the Whippets in any of the four groups were purebred, as maintaining a purebred bloodline was not considered as important as breeding dogs that could win races. Many racing dogs were part-terrier, part-Greyhound, or part-Lurcher.

In 1967, the British Whippet Racing Association was established to bring around reform and consistency in race rules and procedures for races involving non-purebred Whippets. A year later, viewing the non-purebred dogs as a threat, the Whippet Club Racing Association was established exclusively for purebred animals.

Description

Appearance 
There are two height ranges for Whippets, depending on whether or not the dog is being shown in North America. Because colour is considered immaterial in judging Whippets, they come in a wide variety of colours and marking patterns, everything from solid black to solid white, with red, fawn, brindle, blue, or cream. In 2019, The Kennel Club announced it would no longer accept registrations for merle Whippets as it is not a naturally occurring colour in the breed. The coat is short, smooth and close.

This gait results in four of the dog's legs being off the ground twice in each stride, once when the legs are completely extended and again when they are tucked under the body.

Temperament 
Whippets are quiet and reserved but also exhibit a playful side, and require regular exercise. They are generally gentle dogs and are often content to spend much of the day resting. The AKC describes them as "quiet and dignified in their owner's living room" and says they make "excellent house dogs." Whippets have been called a "poor man's racehorse" by the colliers in Lancashire and Yorkshire. 

The whippet will form a strong bond and devotion to their owner and as such can often suffer from  separation anxiety like many other breeds when left alone. They do not bark often but do occasionally in the presence of intruders, making the whippet a passable watch dog similar to other small-medium dogs. However a whippet would likely never attack or guard against anyone due to their gentle and often shy demeanour.

Health 
Whippets course, work, and race; they have been bred for these jobs for years. This has kept them a structurally sound breed which is predominantly free from the physical exaggerations that can lead to certain health problems. Whippets are, like other sighthounds, intolerant of barbiturate anesthetics. This is in part due to their low concentration of body fat and their liver's inability to metabolise the anesthetics.

Given proper nutrition, exercise, and veterinary care, most Whippets live for 12 to 15 years. A UK breed survey puts the median lifespan at 12 years 10 months.  They are generally healthy, and are not prone to the frequent ear infections, skin allergies, or digestive problems that can afflict other breeds. Genetic eye defects, though quite rare, have been noted in the breed. Because of this, the American Whippet Club recommends that breeders test for this defect in their breeding stock. Hip dysplasia is rare in Whippets, with only 1.2% of 161 evaluations performed by the Orthopedic Foundation for Animals being determined as dysplasic.

The heart of a Whippet is large and slow beating, often being arrhythmic or even intermittent when the animal is at rest. This sometimes causes concern to the owner, or to the vet not experienced with the breed. Whippets will, however, demonstrate a regular heartbeat during exercise. In a health survey conducted by The Kennel Club, cardiac problems were shown to be the second leading cause of mortality in Whippets.

A 2007 study identified a myostatin mutation particular to Whippets that is significantly associated with their athletic performance. Whippets with a single copy of this mutation are generally unaffected; those with two copies have disproportionately large musculature and are known as "bully whippets". These bully whippets experience no significant health problems beyond those experienced by a normal whippet, but may be more prone to muscle cramping. The mutation has not been seen in Greyhounds or other sighthound breeds, or in heavily muscled dogs such as Bullmastiffs, Bulldogs, Rottweilers or American Staffordshire Terriers.

Whippets in literature 
Jim the Whippet played a central role in a trilogy of canal travel books by Terry Darlington. Described as a 'narrow dog' he lent his name to the book's titles - Narrow Dog to Carcassonne, Narrow Dog to Indian River and Narrow Dog to Wigan Pier.

In popular culture 
The Whippet is the mascot of Whitewater High School in Whitewater, Wisconsin and Kosciusko High School in Kosciusko, Mississippi.

See also
 Dogs portal
 List of dog breeds

References

External links 
 
 The Origin of the Whippet at justwhippetsrescue.co.uk

FCI breeds
Dog breeds originating in England
Sighthounds